La Ibérica is a traditional chocolate factory in the city of Arequipa, Peru, founded in 1909. The factory provides chocolate in all of its stores in Peru and abroad too.

References

External links
Official site

Food and drink companies established in 1909
Peruvian chocolate companies
1909 establishments in Peru